Inside Hi-Fi is an album by American jazz saxophonist Lee Konitz which was released on the Atlantic label in 1956. The album includes Konitz’s first recorded performance on tenor saxophone.

Critical reception

Scott Yanow of Allmusic states "all eight performances are well played and swinging".

Track listing 
 "Kary's Trance" (Lee Konitz) – 6:09
 "Everything Happens to Me" (Matt Dennis, Tom Adair) – 4:31
 "Sweet and Lovely" (Gus Arnheim, Jules LeMare, Harry Tobias) – 4:03
 "Cork 'n' Bib" (Konitz) – 5:30
 "All of Me" (Gerald Marks, Seymour Simons) – 5:11
 "Star Eyes" (Gene de Paul, Don Raye) – 5:22
 "Nesuhi's Instant" (Peter Ind) – 5:09
 "Indiana" (James F. Hanley, Ballard MacDonald) – 5:18

Personnel 
 Lee Konitz – alto saxophone, tenor saxophone
 Billy Bauer – guitar (tracks 1–4)
 Sal Mosca – piano (tracks 5–8)
 Peter Ind – bass (tracks 5–8)
 Arnold Fishkin – bass (tracks 1–4)
 Dick Scott (Tox Drohar) – drums

References 

Lee Konitz albums
1956 albums
Atlantic Records albums
Albums produced by Nesuhi Ertegun
Albums recorded at Van Gelder Studio